The Bridge of San Luis Rey is a 1927 novel by Thornton Wilder. The Bridge of San Luis Rey may also refer to:

Art, products, entertainment, and media based on the novel 
Films
 The Bridge of San Luis Rey (1929 film)
 The Bridge of San Luis Rey (1944 film)
 The Bridge of San Luis Rey (1958 television play)
 The Bridge of San Luis Rey (2004 film)

Opera
 Die Brücke von San Luis Rey: Szenen nach der Novelle von Thornton Wilder (1954), an opera by German composer Hermann Reutter

Plays
 The Bridge of San Luis Rey (2006), a play for puppets and actors, adapted by Greg Carter (theatre director) and directed by Sheila Daniels

Products
Saint Luis Rey (cigar)